Mashik (also spelled Mshik or Msheek) is a Syrian village located in the Ziyarah Subdistrict of the al-Suqaylabiyah District in Hama Governorate. According to the Syria Central Bureau of Statistics (CBS), Mashik had a population of 311 in the 2004 census.

References 

Populated places in al-Suqaylabiyah District